{{DISPLAYTITLE:C27H39NO7}}
The molecular formula C27H39NO7 (molar mass: 489.60 g/mol, exact mass: 489.2727 u) may refer to:

 Isomigrastatin
 Migrastatin